Dahsala is an Indian system of land taxation which was introduced in A.D. 1580 under the reign of Akbar. This system was introduced by the finance minister of Akbar, Raja Todar Mal, who was appointed in A.D. 1573 in Gujarat, and it helped to make the system of tax collection from non-muslims more organised.

History 
Before the Dahsala system was established the system was disorganised and was in a chaotic form. There were number of reasons for this, one is that the most of the land was owned by wealthy and big landlords and jagirdars (King's officials who were gifted land by the King) who collected their own land revenue and kept majority of the collection and would give the rest to the government which meant that the government would incur big losses. 

Another reason is that land owned by the government was unable to meet the expenses of the state. Therefore, this meant that the government had hardship in maintaining these lands.

Further one of the main reasons for the failure of previous land revenue system is that the cultivators of the land did not know the type of the land they owned, how it is measured, how much they had to pay in terms of cash if they wanted to pay in cash instead of produce.

These reasons meant that the government and the cultivators would lose, and in turn made the people worse off too. 

There were three systems during this period: Dahsala system (also known as the Zabiti system), Nasaq and Galla-bakshi.

Dahsala System 
This system was land revenue system available in majority of Akbar's empire in areas such as Lahore to Allahabad, Malwa and Gujarat. Raj Todar mal was the person who pioneered and introduced this system to the empire.   It was known to be one of the most efficient and effective revenue and record systems. 

The land was measured in ‘bighas’. The Dahsala system changed the land measurement method from using a rope to land measuring system by bamboo pieces connected by iron rings to make the measurement method more accurate. This measurement method was called the Bamboo Jarid system.

Under the Dahsala system lands were classified into four different categories. One was Polaj land which was land which cultivated and yield crops regularly. Second was the Parauti land which was not cultivated as it was left to regain its productivity. Another was known as Chachar land was left uncultivated for 3 to 4 years to make sure yielding a crop once. Fourth type of land was the Banjar land was left for more than 4 years. These lands were of no use. 

These lands were further categorised into three groups. These lands were categorised as grade number 1 land to grade number 3 land, with grade 1 being the best quality land. under the Dahsala system the one third of the crop is known to be the share of the government. The government had done surveys and research to estimate the average produce of different crops and the average crop which would last for 10 so the revenue which was collected by government was fixed according to this ten-year assessment.

The farmers had the choice of paying the government in cash or crops. The farmers who paid in cash the government would check how much the farmers had been producing for ten years and would find the average to find out how much should be paid to the government. Further under the Dahsala system farmers found it easier to obtain loans which was repaid in annual instalments. Also, in situation such as bad season which lead to bad crop yield the government would exclude them from paying the revenue collection. The farmers received a receipt for every payment made to government of the revenue which meant that there was establishment of records under the Dahsala system.

Ghalla Bakshi 
Ghalla Bakshi was another land revenue system used during this period in areas such as the region of Thatta, parts of Kashmir and sarkar of Oandhar. This system was divided into three different systems which include Batai, Khatt Batai and Lang Batai. Batai method was when the harvested crop would be stacked in heaps and the government officer would take one heap according to the state demand (e.g. 4 heaps if ¼; 2 heaps if ½) The Batai system was preferred by many farmers as it helped them during seasonal variations. Khatt Batai method was used in fields which have been sown and the crop unripe were divided by marking to be show the government share. This separation was done by drawing a Khatt or a line of demarcation. The Lang Batai method used the same method as the Batai method except the heaps was made after the grain was separated from the chaff.  The Ghalla Bakshi system used to collect the state share through produce rather than allowing the farmers to pay the estimate of crop. This system benefited the authorities as it was a profitable method however this method was known to be unmanageable as the crop collected from the farmers needed to be collected accurately and also converted into cash by selling them. This method also required people to guard the crops so it would not be stolen or go missing before it was sold.

Nasaq 
Nasaq is also another revenue system which available in this period in areas such as Bengal, Berar and Kashmir. This system was known to be very arbitrary. According to some historians it is believed that this system assessed the revenue demand by finding the average demand of the land for the past ten to twelve years. It was a method of assessment which was based on previous records. In this method the state and cultivator agreed that the fixed sum was paid to the state and the number of crops grown was not taken into consideration. This agreement was called Nasaq.

Appointed officers 
To ensure that the revenue system was successfully established around the empire, Akbar divided the empire into 15 provinces. There officers in charge of the revenue collection system was structured and divided into specific segments to ensure the success of the system.

Faujdar 
Provinces in the empire was divided into districts. A Faujdar was in charge of a number of districts. The Faujdar was the head of the district.A Faujdar of a district is known to be a military officer. The function of the Faujdar according to the revenue system of the empire was to collect land revenue from areas of the district where the people were unmanageable. The Faujdar was also responsible of ensuring that the efficiency of the administration. Therefore, to ensure that the Faujdar does their job well, Akbar introduced officers to spy and check on the Faujdars.

Amal Guzar 
The Amal Guzar next important officer. They were also known as the revenue collectors. Amal Guzar were people who supervised the officers who were in charge of the revenue administration. The another function of the Amal Guzar other than collecting revenue was to protect the peasantry by punishing robbers and the miscreants. The Amal Guzar also had the authorisation of advance loans to the peasantry and they were responsible that these loans were repaid back. The Amal Guzar would ensure that the district treasurer would send information about the monthly receipts and expenditure of the district to the royal treasurer.

Bitikshi 
The Bitikshi is an important assistant to the Amal Guzar. Professionally he is known to be a writer, preparing records in terms about the land assessment. The Bitikshi was responsible to collect the average revenue statement of each village from the Quanungo. The Bitikshi also maintained data about the land such their boundaries and which land was useful for cultivation and which was waste land. The Bitikshi was also in charge in producing a receipt to the cultivators who pay the revenue to the treasurer. The Bitikshi would also keep record of the weekly and monthly income and expenditure.

Khazandar 
Khazandar is known to be the treasurer. Khazanzar was responsible for the collection of revenue in the district and forward it to the central treasurer. The Khazandar was told to accept coin from the former reigns to be collect as bullion and they were not allowed to harass the cultivators who pay in copper, silver or gold or any kind of coin. The Khazandar was not allowed to force the paying cultivators to pay more if the coins paid was less than the required amount they have to pay. To ensure that collected revenue is safe the Khazandar would have several locks and one of the keys was given to the Amil and the other is kept with himself.

Shiqqdar 
Shiqqdar was not directly involved with the revenue system. Shiqqdar is known to be the chief executive officer of the pargana and responsible to the general administration. The Shiqqdar contributes to the revenue system by provided the Amal Guzar with police assistance to collect money. The Shiqqdar would ensure that the pargana remained peaceful. The Shiqqdar is also responsible to supervise the treasury staff.

Fotadar 
The Fotadar and the Khazander had the same job except the Fotadar did it in terms of a pargana (treasure of the pargana). The karkuns kept records about information of the land such as which land is useful and which is waste land, the revenue payable from individual cultivator, and the actual collections and arrears.

Qanungo 
The Qanungo is the local revenue official of the pargana. The Qanungo was in charge of keeping records of the crop such as the revenue demands, payments and arrears. The Qanungo were also in charge of keeping records of value tenure such as the extent and the transfers of the land. The Qanungo was paid one per cent commission on the revenue of the pargana however this was changed by Akbar to a salary.  Qanungo was divided into three grades, the lowest was given twenty rupees a month, the middle received thirty rupees per month and the highest grade received fifty rupees per month.

Muqaddam and Patwari 
The Muqaddam and Patwari are consider are in charge of the administration of village. The Patwari is in charge of the revenue affairs of the village. The Patwari has records of the land in the villages such as the land size, the crop grown, the cultivators, unused land.

Chaudhari 
The Chaudari plays a leading role in the revenue collection system. The Chaudari does the recording of the sale of lands, customer and commercial transaction. Another function of the Chaudhari is to check the work of the Qanungo to ensure there are no mistakes on their part. Further he was also required to show evidence for transactions such as the sale and mortgage of a land.

Twelve Regulations 
The Twelve Regulations of Todar Mal set a standard for future administrators to follow. There were many problems which came with the Dahsala system and other revenue systems which was present at the time. The Twelve Regulations help to overcome the difficulties faced and showed how the revenue system had to be followed. The Twelve Regulations were based on the organisational structure, procedure of measure, unit of assessment, method of collection. loan, relief and the working of the central revenue department.

The Regulations about the organisational structure would mention how to overcome the problems faced with the officers in charge of the revenue system. It also states if the changes which need to take place in each position. The Regulations about procedure of measure states how the land would be measured and which method would be used to measure the different types of land. The Regulations about the unit of assessment ensures that assessment is done in a such away where it is less time-consuming and laborious process. The Regulations about the method of collection states that the ideal method of collection is that the cultivators deposit the revenue and the obtain the receipt. This would get rid of any intermediaries. Therefore, to ensure this method is being effective the collector provides a due date to provide their revenue if not the collector would come and collect the revenue from the cultivator.  However, if the treasurer fails to provide the receipt or the cultivator fails to obtain the receipt the fault would be on the collector. The Regulations also mentions about different payment methods such as progressive payment methods. 

The Twelve Regulations of Todar mal's was used as standard a century after to create new regulations by Aurangzeb.

Main features 
The Dahsala system ensured that everyone a part of the system and affected by the system would benefit. Further system was organised which made maintaining accounts of income and expenditure easier. The system had been in effect for a long time therefore the government was able to make the system perfect by overcoming the problems. The Dahsala system ensured that there was no fluctuations or uncertainties in the amount to be paid to the government allowing the farmers to know exactly how much should be paid to the government. Also these farmers were protected from the officers who would usually exploit the farmers charging arbitrary amounts from different farmers without clear reasoning. Further the amount needed to be paid could easily be measured and rechecked. 

There are also some limitations in the Dahsala System. There was misusing of authority during the measurement of land making the revenue to be paid inaccurate. Therefore, sometimes the farmers had to pay more than they are supposed to. Further many of the revenue officials were dishonest and corrupt which meant the peasants were affected by the power used by the officials. However Akbar ensured that welfare of the cultivators was improved and maintained. These officials also would bother the cultivators to pay high revenue.

References 

History of India
History of taxation in India
Land taxation